The Confederation of Democracy (CODE) was an electoral alliance of center-right Chilean political parties formed in July 1972. Its main purpose was to unite all the opposition parties of the Popular Unity government to face the parliamentary elections in March 1973. Its main objective was to optimize the collection of votes and seats, and accomplish the majority of Congress and thus obtain at least two thirds of the deputies.

History
Between the opposition to the Popular Unity government, there were two opposing views. On the one hand the National Party (PN) and the Radical Democracy (DR) who saw the CODE as a way to definitively defeat the parties of the Popular Unity (UP). The Christian Democratic Party (PDC), together with the Radical Left Party (PIR) and the National Democratic Party (PADENA), constituted for them a way of controlling the UP within the legal framework.

To do so, they took advantage of the opinion of the Electoral Court of June 6, 1972, which allowed the creation of electoral coalitions (or federated or confederate parties according to the legislation) in the elections of the National Congress of March 1973. This sentence repealed that of 1962 which prohibited general electoral pacts (only in the case of the election of senators since 1960 were allowed pacts, but these were also prohibited with another reform in 1962).

His first action, albeit unofficial, was in the by-elections of January 1972, in which the CODE defeated the UP and rescue a deputy and a senator.

This coalition was formed by two federations of parties, both also constituted on 6 July 1972:

 The Democratic Opposition Federation (FOD), made up of the Christian Democratic Party (PDC), the Radical Left Party (PIR) and the National Democratic Party (PADENA). Its first board was composed by Eric Campaña Barrios (president), René Abeliuk (secretary) and Enrique Rodríguez Ballesteros (treasurer). Its symbol was a rhombus with the emblems of the three federated parties: the symbol of the PDC in its apex superior, the one of the PIR in the left vertex and the one of PADENA in the right, and the initials of the federation in the center. It was legalized by the Direction of the Electoral Register on September 22, 1972.

 The National-Radical Democracy Federation (FNDR), made up of the National Party (PN) and Radical Democracy (DR). Its first board was made up of Hernán Figueroa Anguita (president), Fernando Ochagavía Valdés (vice president), Carlos Reymond (secretary) and Diego Portales Frías (treasurer). Its symbol was a chain formed by three circles. It was legalized by the Direction of the Electoral Register on October 2, 1972.

The Confederation of Democracy was legalized by the Direction of the Electoral Register on October 6, 1972.

According to the results in the parliamentary elections of 1973 the CODE won the majority of the Chamber of Deputies, but did not obtain a two-thirds majority (100 deputies) that would have allowed him to block any constitutional reform and conduct an impeachment against President Allende. This last point was the objective of CODE.

After installing the new National Congress the CODE was dissolved, as said in their founding statute, which formally stated May 20, 1973 as the date of the formal dissolution. However, the Electoral Register legally dissolved the CODE on July 5. On August 8 the National-Radical Democracy Federation was also dissolved.

Program
The CODE's goals and program have been based on:
 Liberty and labor rights
 Better freedom of speech and information
 Change of the Chilean Constitution
 Ending of the political violence and law and order policies
 Normalization of the political situation.

Composition

Electoral results

References 

Defunct political party alliances in Chile
Presidential Republic (1925–1973)
Presidency of Salvador Allende